Salvador Sánchez-Terán Hernández (19 April 1934 – 31 December 2022) was a Spanish politician from the Union of the Democratic Centre (UCD) who served as Minister of Labour from May to September 1980 and previously as Minister of Transport and Communications from February 1978 to May 1980.

Sánchez-Terán died on 31 December 2022, at the age of 88.

References

1934 births
2022 deaths
Government ministers of Spain
20th-century Spanish politicians
Labour ministers of Spain
Transport ministers of Spain
Civil governors of Barcelona
Union of the Democratic Centre (Spain) politicians
Members of the constituent Congress of Deputies (Spain)
People from Logroño